Natalie Phelps Finnie is the Director of the Illinois Department of Natural Resources. She was a Democratic  member of the Illinois House of Representatives, representing the 118th District from September 2017 to January 2019.

Early life and career
Finnie received her Associate of Science and Bachelor of Science in Nursing at the University of Southern Indiana. She received her Master of Science in Nursing at Vanderbilt University. Phelps Finnie lives in Elizabethtown, Illinois with her husband, son, and two daughters. She is the daughter of former U.S. Representative David D. Phelps.

Illinois House of Representatives
On September 1, 2017, Brandon Phelps resigned from the Illinois House of Representatives. The Democratic Representative Committee of the 118th Representative District appointed Phelps Finnie to fill the vacancy left by the resignation. She was sworn into office on September 6, 2017. The 118th district, located in Southern Illinois, includes all or parts of Anna, Belknap, Belle Prairie City, Brookport, Broughton, Buncombe, Burnside, Cairo, Carbondale, Carrier Mills, Cave-In-Rock, Cypress, Dahlgren, Dongola, East Cape Girardeau, Eddyville, Eldorado, Elizabethtown, Equality, Galatia, Golconda, Goreville, Harrisburg, Joppa, Junction, Karnak, Makanda, Marion, McClure, McLeansboro, Metropolis, Mound City, Mounds, New Grand Chain, New Haven, Old Shawneetown, Olive Branch, Olmsted, Omaha, Pulaski, Raleigh, Ridgway, Rosiclare, Shawneetown, Simpson, Stonefort, Tamms, Thebes, Ullin, and Vienna.

Phelps Finnie lost the 2018 general election to Republican candidate Patrick Windhorst by a 12.9 point margin.

Post-legislative career
After her loss, she took a position as deputy director of the Illinois Department of Natural Resources, where she oversaw the Office of Land Management, Legislative Department, Office of Oil & Gas Management, and Office of Mines and Mineral. On January 23, 2023, it was announced that Governor J. B. Pritzker appointed Finnie as director of the department.

References

External links
 Profile at Illinois General Assembly

Living people
Year of birth missing (living people)
People from Elizabethtown, Illinois
Democratic Party members of the Illinois House of Representatives
Women state legislators in Illinois
21st-century American politicians
21st-century American women politicians